The San Antonio Championship was a golf tournament on the Champions Tour. It was played annually in October in San Antonio, Texas, and was the final full-field event of the Champions Tour season. AT&T was the main sponsor of the tournament from 2006 to 2014. The Canyons Course at TPC San Antonio took over as host beginning in 2011. It was previously played at the Oak Hills Country Club.

The purse for the 2015 tournament was US$1,800,000, with $270,000 going to the winner. The tournament was founded in 1985 as the Dominion Seniors.

Winners
All winners are Americans unless otherwise indicated.
San Antonio Championship
2015  Bernhard Langer

AT&T Championship
2014 Michael Allen
2013 Kenny Perry
2012  David Frost
2011 Fred Couples
2010  Rod Spittle
2009 Phil Blackmar
2008 John Cook
2007 John Cook
2006 Fred Funk

SBC Championship
2005 Jay Haas
2004 / Mark McNulty
2003 Craig Stadler
2002 Dana Quigley
2001 Larry Nelson
2000 Doug Tewell

Southwestern Bell Dominion
1999 John Mahaffey
1998 Lee Trevino
1997  David Graham

SBC Dominion Seniors
1996 Tom Weiskopf

SBC presents The Dominion Seniors
1995 Jim Albus

Vantage at The Dominion
1994 Jim Albus
1993 J. C. Snead
1992 Lee Trevino
1991 Lee Trevino
1990 Jim Dent

RJR at The Dominion
1989 Larry Mowry

Vantage at The Dominion
1988 Billy Casper
1987 Chi-Chi Rodríguez

Benson & Hedges Invitational
1986  Bruce Crampton

Dominion Seniors
1985 Don January

Source:

Multiple winners
Three men have won the event more than once.

3 wins
Lee Trevino: 1991, 1992, 1998
2 wins
Jim Albus: 1994, 1995
John Cook: 2007, 2008

References

External links
Coverage on the Champions Tour's official site

Former PGA Tour Champions events
Golf in Texas
Sports competitions in San Antonio
Recurring sporting events established in 1985
Recurring sporting events disestablished in 2015
Defunct sports competitions in the United States
1985 establishments in Texas
2015 disestablishments in Texas